The 1985 German Formula Three Championship was a multi-event motor racing championship for single-seat open wheel formula racing cars held across Europe. The championship featured drivers competing in two-litre Formula Three racing cars which conformed to the technical regulations, or formula, for the championship. It commenced on 24 March at Zolder and ended at Nürburgring on 22 September after fourteen rounds.

Josef Kaufmann Racing driver Volker Weidler clinched the championship title. He won races at Wunstorf, AVUS, Erding, Norisring, Zolder and Siegerland. Kris Nissen lost 33 points to Weidler and finished as runner-up, scoring the same number of wins as Weidler. Nissen's teammate Adrian Campos completed top-three in the drivers' standings. Eric Bachelart and Jari Nurminen were the only other drivers who were able to win a race in the season.

Teams and drivers

Calendar

Results

Championship standings
Points are awarded as follows:

References

External links
 

German Formula Three Championship seasons
Formula Three season